This is a breakdown of the results of the 2009 German federal election. The following tables display detailed results in each of the sixteen states and all 299 single-member constituencies.

Electoral system 
According to Article 38 of the Basic Law for the Federal Republic of Germany, members of the Bundestag shall be elected in general, direct, free, equal and secret elections; everyone over the age of eighteen is entitled to vote.

In 2008, some modifications to the electoral system were required under an order of the Federal Constitutional Court. The court had found a provision in the Federal Election Law by which it was possible for a party to experience a negative vote weight, thus losing seats due to more votes, violated the constitutional guarantee of the electoral system being equal and direct. The court allowed three years for these changes, so the 2009 federal election was not affected.

The Bundestag is elected using mixed-member proportional representation. Each voter has two votes, a first vote for the election of a constituency candidate (by method of first-past-the-post), and a second vote for the election of a state list. The Sainte-Laguë/Schepers method is used to convert the votes into seats, in a two-stage process with each stage involving two calculations. First, the number of seats to be allocated to each state is calculated, based on the proportion of the German population living there. Then the seats in each state are allocated to the party lists in that state, based on the proportion of second votes each party received.

In the distribution of seats among state lists, only parties that have obtained at least five percent of the valid second votes cast in the electoral area or have won a seat in at least three constituencies are taken into consideration.

Additional "overhang seats" are created to ensure that no party receives fewer than its guaranteed minimum number of seats. This has the side-effect of inflating the size of the Bundestag if a party wins more direct mandates than its vote share entitles it to. Once the number of seats which each party is entitled to receive across the country has been determined, the seats are allocated to the parties' individual state lists.

Nationwide

Leaders' races

By state

Summary

Schleswig-Holstein

Mecklenburg-Vorpommern

Hamburg

Lower Saxony

Bremen

Brandenburg

Saxony-Anhalt

Berlin

North Rhine-Westphalia

Saxony

Hesse

Thuringia

Rhineland-Palatinate

Bavaria

Baden-Württemberg

Saarland

Notes

References

2009 elections in Germany
2009